The 2016 Trophée de France was the fourth event of six in the 2016–17 ISU Grand Prix of Figure Skating, a senior-level international invitational competition series. It was held at the AccorHotels Arena in Paris on November 11–13. Medals were awarded in the disciplines of men's singles, ladies' singles, pair skating, and ice dancing. Skaters earned points toward qualifying for the 2016–17 Grand Prix Final.

The competition, known as the Trophée Éric Bompard since 2004, lost its title sponsor in the summer of 2016 due to a lack of communication from the French Federation of Ice Sports.

Entries
The ISU published the preliminary assignments on June 30, 2016.

Changes to initial assignments

The French organisers decided not to replace Mendoza/Kovalev despite the ISU's rules stating that it is "mandatory" to invite another pair if one withdraws more than 14 days before the event. The pairs' competition ended up with only six entries after a further withdrawal (Esbrat / Novoselov).

Results

Men

Ladies

Pairs

Ice dancing

References

External links
 2016 Trophée de France at the International Skating Union

Internationaux de France
Trophée de France
Trophée de France
November 2016 sports events in France